Guillermina Uribe Bone (1920 - 11 October 2018) was a civil engineer and the first woman to receive a degree in civil engineering from the Faculty of Mathematics and Engineering of the National University of Colombia in Bogotá, graduating on 18 December 1948.

Early life 
Guillermina Uribe was born in Guatemala City in 1920. She was the daughter of Guillermo Uribe Echevarría, a Basque accountant and Maria Teresa Bone Romero, a Guatemalan of English descent. She had seven siblings. Her older siblings were Antonio who became an aviator, Rebeca, the first woman to earn an engineering degree in Colombia, and Helena who became a doctor. Her younger siblings were Carmen, María Teresa, Roberto and Jorge.

In 1928, she moved with her family to Argentina, where her father planned to take up work, and they made a stopover in Medellín. In the end, the family settled there instead.

Education 
She graduated from high school in 1941 at the Emakumeen Institutu Zentralean (Central Women's Institute), and the family moved to Bogota. Her parents were supportive of all their daughters' education and encouraged Guillermina in studying civil engineering, beginning in 1943. She later said in 2004, “Mi papá estaba adelantado para la época, por eso nos estimuló muchísimo. Él tenía un pensamiento sobre la mujer más amplio”. "My father was ahead of his time, which is why he encouraged us so much. He had wider expectations about women." There were 40 students on the course, and the first year she studied at the facilities of the Central Technical Institute, then went to the University City Campus. There was one other woman studying civil engineering, Rosalba Pachón Gómez, who completed some courses in 1944 but graduated in 1948, after Guillermina.

Career 
In 1949, she joined the Ministry of Works, in the National Buildings section, and working on projects with three other engineers. Her first job was for the Cali Post Office building; then she was responsible for checking the design of the Olympic Stadium in Santa Marta, a project led by a German engineer. She spent two years in the ministry, the first before graduating and the second as a fully qualified engineer.

Personal life 
She married fellow engineer Francisco Stella Ibáñez during her second year in the role, and they eventually had nine children, seven of whom studied at university. Francisco became an electrical engineer; Nicolas became a physicist; María del Carmen became an architect; Luz María became a teacher; María Teresa an architect; María del Rosario became an Architectural Drawing Technician, and Elena and Guillermo.

Recognition 
In 2011, as part of an Exhibition Fair held in celebration of the 150th anniversary of the first engineering faculty in Colombia, a tribute was paid to Uribe Bone. The ceremony was attended by President Juan Manuel Santos and Guillermina Uribe Bone was the guest of honour. This was the first time her role as a ground breaking woman engineer had been publicly acknowledged, at the age of 94.

In 2020, the Teknologiaren historiarako Nazioarteko Batzordeak (Icohtec) (the International Commission for the History of Technology) released an online film, tracing the entry of Colombian women into STEM careers from the nineteenth century onwards. The aim was to identify ground breaking women and showcase them as role models for modern girls and women. Only 32% of engineering students in Colombia are female (as of 2020) and the film was intended to encourage more women to take up the subject.

Guillermina Uribe Bone died in Bogotá at the age of 98.

References 

1920 births
2018 deaths
Colombian civil engineers
Colombian women engineers
20th-century women engineers
People from Guatemala City
Colombian people of Basque descent
Colombian people of English descent
20th-century Colombian women scientists
Immigrants to Colombia
Guatemalan emigrants